USS Atglen (ID-1315), also sometimes listed as ID-1350, was a United States Navy barge in service from 1917 to 1919.

Atglen was laid down as a non-self-propelled commercial barge at South Roundout, New York, in 1900. The U.S. Navy 3rd Naval District inspected her for possible World War I service in 1917, and the Navy acquired her on 16 November 1917, assigning her one of two reported Naval Registry Identification Numbers (either Id. No. 1315 or Id. No. 1350 She probably served in and near New York Harbor through the end of the war.

Atglen was returned to her owners sometime in 1919.

Notes

References
Department of the Navy Naval Historical Center: Online Library of Selected Images: Civilian Ships: Atglen (American Barge, 1900). Probably saw U.S. Navy service (under registry ID # 1315) in 1917-1919
NavSource Online: Section Patrol Craft Photo Archive Atglen (ID 1315)
NavSource Online: Section Patrol Craft Photo Archive Atglen (ID 1350)

Ships built in New York (state)
1900 ships
World War I auxiliary ships of the United States
Barges of the United States Navy